Strathy Hall is an antebellum plantation house located near Richmond Hill in Bryan County, Georgia. It was constructed circa 1840 by George W. McAllister, the paternal uncle of Archibald McAllister, who owned Strathy Hall Plantation, a large rice plantation on the Ogeechee River.

Based on photographs, the house was much larger in the early 20th century, due to additions and alterations.  Henry Ford removed the additions when he bought the property in the 1920s.  The house is raised slightly on brick piers.  The inside walls are plastered and have a concave moulding.  The floors are made of pine.

See also
 National Register of Historic Places listings in Bryan County, Georgia

References

External links

Houses on the National Register of Historic Places in Georgia (U.S. state)
Houses completed in 1840
Houses in Bryan County, Georgia
Plantation houses in Georgia (U.S. state)
National Register of Historic Places in Bryan County, Georgia
1840 establishments in Georgia (U.S. state)